The Chess World Cup 2007 served as a qualification tournament for the World Chess Championship 2010. It was held as a 128-player single-elimination tournament, between 24 November and 16 December 2007, in Khanty-Mansiysk, Russia.

In an event attended by most leading players of the world, American Gata Kamsky emerged as the winner. He was unbeaten in the tournament, going into tie-break only once and defeating Spaniard Alexei Shirov, 2½–1½, in the four-game final. Two 17-year-old players, Sergey Karjakin and Magnus Carlsen, reached the semifinals.

By winning, Kamsky qualified for the Challenger Match, the final stage in determining the challenger for the World Chess Championship 2010; his participation in that match allowed him direct entry into the Candidates Matches for the World Chess Championship 2012.

The final four also received direct entry into the FIDE Grand Prix 2008–10, a qualifying stage for the World Chess Championship 2012.

The winner of the Chess World Cup 2005, Levon Aronian, was defeated by Dmitry Jakovenko in the fourth round.

Background
The 2007 World Cup was part of the cycle for the World Chess Championship 2010. Gata Kamsky, as the winner of this tournament, played an eight-game match against Veselin Topalov in 2008, for the right to be the challenger for the World Chess Championship 2010. Ultimately Topalov won the match and will face World Champion Viswanathan Anand, who successfully defended his title against former champion Vladimir Kramnik at the World Chess Championship 2008.

Prominent non-participants
Vladimir Kramnik and Veselin Topalov were ineligible to participate, due to special privileges they already had in the 2008–2010 World Championship cycle.

All other leading players, including world champion Viswanathan Anand, were eligible to participate. However Anand, who was already seeded into the 2008–2010 cycle, elected not to play.

Three other players who had recently competed in the World Chess Championship 2007 in Mexico – Péter Lékó, Aleksandr Morozevich and Boris Gelfand – elected not to play. Lékó and Morozevich refused to take part as a form of protest against the special privileges given for the inclusion of Kramnik and Topalov in the World Chess Championship Cycle.

The only other player from the Top 30 who did not participate was Judit Polgár.

Qualification
The final list of 128 qualifiers for the World Cup was as follows:
Three of the eight participants of the World Chess Championship 2007 (Levon Aronian, Peter Svidler, Alexander Grischuk). The other five qualifiers in this category were replaced by five players from the average rating list.
Women's World Champion 2006 (Xu Yuhua).
Junior World Champion 2006 (Zaven Andriasian).
Twenty-five players with the highest Elo rating (including five replacements). The average ratings from July 2006 and January 2007 were used.
89 players qualified from the continental and zonal championships:
45 players from Europe (16 from the 2006 European Individual Chess Championship and 29 from 2007)
19 players from the Americas (7 from the 4th American Continental Championship, 12 from the 2.1 through 2½ Zonals),
19 players from Asia and Oceania (10 from the 6th Asian Championship, 9 from the 3.1 through 3.6 Zonals),
6 players from Africa (2007 African Championship).
5 nominees of the FIDE President (Sergei Rublevsky, Evgeny Bareev, Sergei Zhigalko, Ziaur Rahman, and Boris Savchenko).
4 nominees of the local Organising Committee (Evgeny Alekseev, Nikolai Kabanov, Aleksei Pridorozhni, and Vladimir Genba).

The individual Zones (for Zonals) are described in the FIDE handbook.

Participants
All players are Grandmasters unless indicated otherwise.

 , 2787
 , 2752
 , 2742
 , 2741
 , 2739
 , 2732
 , 2729
 , 2716
 , 2715
 , 2714
 , 2714
 , 2713
 , 2710
 , 2705
 , 2703
 , 2695
 , 2694
 , 2692
 , 2691
 , 2691
 , 2690
 , 2690
 , 2683
 , 2679
 , 2678
 , 2678
 , 2676
 , 2674
 , 2674
 , 2674
 , 2670
 , 2668
 , 2668
 , 2661
 , 2661
 , 2660
 , 2657
 , 2656
 , 2655
 , 2654
 , 2653
 , 2649
 , 2649
 , 2648
 , 2646
 , 2646
 , 2645
 , 2644
 , 2643
 , 2643
 , 2643
 , 2643
 , 2643
 , 2641
 , 2639
 , 2635
 , 2634
 , 2627
 , 2626
 , 2616
 , 2615
 , 2610
 , 2609
 , 2608
 , 2608
 , 2607
 , 2606
 , 2606
 , 2601
 , 2597
 , 2597
 , 2594
 , 2593
 , 2592
 , 2592
 , 2591
 , 2587
 , 2586
 , 2585
 , 2584
 , 2584
 , 2583
 , 2582
 , 2576
 , 2573
 , 2569
 , 2569
 , 2568
 , 2566, IM
 , 2565
 , 2565
 , 2565
 , 2563
 , 2562
 , 2561
 , 2561
 , 2552
 , 2552
 , 2547
 , 2546
 , 2546
 , 2544
 , 2534
 , 2531
 , 2530
 , 2528
 , 2520, IM
 , 2517
 , 2515, IM
 , 2514, IM
 , 2512, IM
 , 2511, IM
 , 2508, IM
 , 2506, IM
 , 2503, IM
 , 2497
 , 2496, IM
 , 2494
 , 2491, IM
 , 2484
 , 2480, IM
 , 2477, IM
 , 2435, IM
 , 2429, IM
 , 2427, IM
 , 2413, IM
 , 2389, FM
 , 2352, IM

1 Izoria did not appear at the Cup due to visa problems. Gonzalez Zamora did not appear at the Cup due to illness.

Playing conditions
The tournament is in the style of the FIDE World Chess Championships 1998–2004: each round consists of a two-game match (except for the final round, which will be a four-game match), followed by tie breaks at faster time controls if required.

The time control for regular games is 90 minutes for the first 40 moves and 30 minutes for the rest of the game, with 30 seconds added after each move. Tie breaks consist of two rapid chess games (25 minutes each + 10 seconds per move); followed by two blitz games if required (5 minutes + 10 seconds per move); followed by a single Armageddon chess game if required (white has 6 minutes and must win, black has 5 minutes and only needs to draw).

The prize money ranged from US$6,000 for players eliminated in the first round to $80,000 for the losing finalist and $120,000 for the winner.

Results, rounds 1–4

Summary

Round 1
Most of the top seeds progressed. From the top 32, the only higher seeded players eliminated were Pavel Eljanov (19th seed), Konstantin Landa (25) and Pendyala Harikrishna (32).

Round 2
Players in the top 32 eliminated in regular games were Teimour Radjabov (seeded 3), Loek van Wely (24). Top 32 players eliminated in tie breaks were Rustam Kasimdzhanov (22), Andrei Volokitin (26) and Vadim Zvjaginsev (30). This left 24 of the top 32 seeds in the final 32.

High seeds needing tie breaks to progress included Vassily Ivanchuk (1), Magnus Carlsen (10), Ruslan Ponomariov (14) and Wang Yue (15).

Round 3
After the two regular games, 10 of the 16 matches had decisive results. Players going through on the regular games are: Alexei Shirov (seeded 5), Michael Adams (7), Evgeny Alekseev (8), Magnus Carlsen (10), Gata Kamsky (11), Vladimir Akopian (12), Dmitry Jakovenko (13), Ruslan Ponomariov (14), Wang Yue (15) and Ivan Cheparinov (31). Cheparinov eliminated the number 2 seed Shakhriyar Mamedyarov.

The other six matches were decided in the tie breaks. Winners were Liviu-Dieter Nisipeanu (33) (eliminating top seed Vassily Ivanchuk), Krishnan Sasikiran (35), Evgeny Bareev (41), Levon Aronian (4), Peter Svidler (6), Sergey Karjakin (17).

Round 4
In the regular time control games, Shirov, Ponomariov, Carlsen, Karjakin and Cheparinov won their respective matches against Akopian, Sasikiran, Adams, Nisipeanu and Wang Yue. The other three matches (Jakovenko-Aronian, Svidler-Kamsky and Bareev-Alekseev) proceed to tie breaks, with wins to Jakovenko, Kamsky and Alekseev.

Section 1

Section 2

Section 3

Section 4

Section 5

Section 6

Section 7

Section 8

Results, rounds 5–7

Chessbase reports: Round five Game one;
Round five Game two;
Round five tie breaks;
Round six Game one.

Final stats

13 December – 16 December

References

External links
 Official site

2007
World Cup
World Cup
Sport in Khanty-Mansiysk
2007 in Russian sport
International sports competitions hosted by Russia